Ernest Benjamin Aurish (9 August 1878 – 8 October 1950) was an Australian rules footballer who played with St Kilda in the Victorian Football League (VFL).

References

External links 

1878 births
1950 deaths
Australian rules footballers from Victoria (Australia)
St Kilda Football Club players